Ragnemalm is a surname. Notable people with the surname include:

Hans Ragnemalm (1940–2016), Swedish lawyer, judge, and professor emeritus of public law
Ingemar Ragnemalm, Swedish computer programmer

Surnames of Swedish origin